A huerta is an irrigated area, or a field within such an area, common in Spain and Portugal.

Huerta may also refer to:

 Huerta (surname)

Places 
 Huerta, Salamanca, a municipality in the province of Salamanca, Castile and León
 Huerta de Rey, a municipality in the province of Burgos, Castile and León
 Huerta de la Obispalía, a municipality in the province of Cuenca, Castilla-La Mancha
 Huerta del Marquesado, a municipality in the province of Cuenca, Castilla-La Mancha
 Huerta de Murcia, a comarca in the region of Murcia in Spain
 La Huerta, Chile in Chile
 La Huerta, Jalisco in Mexico
 La Huerta, New Mexico in the United States
 La Huerta, Parañaque in the Philippines

See also
 Santa María de Huerta a municipality in Soria, Castile and León, Spain
 Huertas, a surname
 Horta (disambiguation)